Jitendra Joshi is an Indian actor and reality show host who predominantly works in Marathi cinema. He is well known for his lead role as Sant Tukaram Maharaj in the 2012 marathi movie Tukaram. He starred as constable Katekar in the hit Netflix television series Sacred Games.

Career

Joshi also wrote the popular song Kombdi Palali, which was later remixed as Chikni Chameli. He got his first recognition from the Zee Marathi daily soap Ghadlay Bighadlay where he played Krishna. In 2011, he hosted Marathi Paaul Padte Pudhe, a talent reality show on the Zee Marathi. In Marathi he played title role of Sant Tukaram in Tukaram (film released in 2012) and a comic role in Guldasta. Not only as a hero, but he has also appeared as Sai, a villain character in the film Duniyadari (2013). In 2016, he co-starred in the critically acclaimed dramedy Ventilator, which was produced by Priyanka Chopra. His performance in the film was widely praised. In 2018, he starred in the Netflix Original Series Sacred Games alongside Saif Ali Khan where he played the role of constable Katekar.

In 2021 Joshi won the Best Actor Award at 52nd International Film Festival of India for his role as Nishikant Deshmukh in Nikhil Mahajan's Marathi film Godavari.

He was also impressive as the devious villager in Netflix's Thar (2022).

Filmography

Films

Television

Web series

Theatre

Awards and nominations

References

External links

 
 

Male actors in Hindi cinema
Living people
Marathi people
Indian male television actors
Male actors in Marathi cinema
Male actors in Marathi theatre
Marathi-language writers
Male actors from Pune
Savitribai Phule Pune University alumni
Indian male soap opera actors
21st-century Indian male actors
Male actors in Marathi television
1979 births
IFFI Best Actor (Male) winners